The kolomyika (also spelled kolomeyka or kolomeike) is a Hutsul (Slavic) music genre that combines a fast-paced folk dance and comedic rhymed verses. It includes a type of performance dance developed by the Ukrainian diaspora in North America.

It originated in the village of Kolomyia, in the Hutsul region of east Galicia, in what is now a western Ukraine. It was historically popular among the Ukrainians and Poles, and is also known (as the kalamajka) in north-eastern Slovenia where some Ukrainians settled in Austro-Hungarian times.

Kolomyikas are still danced in Ukraine and Poland as a tradition on certain holidays, during festivities, or simply for fun. In Ukraine's west, they are popular dances for weddings.

The kolomyka can be a combination of tune, song, and dance with some recordings having a line of singing alternating with a line of instrumental melody, whilst others are purely instrumental. The text tends to be in rhyming couplets and is a humorous commentary on everyday life. Its simple 2/4 rhythm and structures make the kolomyika very adaptable, and the text and melodies of thousands of different versions have been annotated. One collection done by Volodymyr Shukhevych in 1905, contains more than 8,000. Although a very old form they continue to be popular due to their fast, energetic, and exciting melodies, often with syncopation.

The kolomyika-style verse of the song is syllabic, consisting of two lines of 14 syllables (or of four lines: 8 + 6 + 8 + 6). This is typical not only for a kolomyika, but also for historical, everyday, ballad, and other Ukrainian folk songs. It was very often used by Taras Shevchenko.

The National Anthem of Ukraine was also written in kolomyika verse.

History of study 
The active process of creation and functioning of kolomyikas testifies to the vitality of this genre.

The specificity of kolomyika was once determined by the famous folklorist F. Kolessa:

However, according to V. Hoshovsky, kolomyika is a song type, much older than the genre itself: its roots go back to the seventeenth century. Based on the discovery of F. Kolessa, V. Hoshovsky researched songs of the kolomyika type, which were widespread not only in Western but also in Eastern Ukraine. Kolomyika is one of the most popular and favorite genres in Western Ukraine.

The time of origin of this genre is unknown. Its name indicates the place of fixation: the city of Kolomyia, Stanisławów, now Ivano-Frankivsk region (Hutsul region). Kolomyia has been historically popular among Poles, Ukrainians and is also known (dance) in northeastern Slovenia (as kalamajka). Remaining initially local, the dance became especially popular among the urban population of the surrounding areas in the middle of the XIX century.

The size of the kolomyika (only two lines in which the words should be placed so that each line had fourteen syllables) contributed to the development of conciseness, stable poetic formulas, economic and accurate use of tropes - features inherent in well-honed artistic miniatures. Due to the richness of internal rhyme and announcements, kolomyikas never give the impression of being monotonous.

Kolomyikas have a two-dimensional structure: the image of nature of the first line by analogy or contrast enhances the semantic and emotional meaning of the thought expressed in the second line. Sometimes the first line acts as a traditional spice, the content of which is not always related to the next line. Most often it is the beginning "Oh, the cuckoo flew (peacock, swallow)", "On a high wormwood", "Oh, green oak" and others. In the works there is a noticeable tendency to avoid such customs, which is explained by the journalistic direction of most modern kolomyikas.

The content of kolomyika 
Complaints about forced labor, bitter soldiering, poor breadlessness, forced emigration, protest against peasant lawlessness, and rebellious prayers are heard in the kolomyika about the people's past. The largest array of songs, which are about personal life, their experiences, moods - these are works on the so-called "eternal themes", equally relevant for different eras, but they are easy to catch the signs of the times, because human relationships develop on against the background of a certain family and social life.

It is very difficult to characterize the thematic branches of the kolomyika genre, because "kolomyikas migrate and twinkle like pearls of a scattered necklace, and only" brought together in a system that unites them according to content, they form a broad image of our modern people's life. colors, where we see tears, and joys, and rests, worries and entertainments, serious thoughts and genres of our people in its various developments, its neighbors, its social condition, its public and individual life from a cradle to a grave, its traditions and beliefs, its social and ethnic ideals»

The world of sonorous beauty, pure, sublime feelings, jokes, irony, jokes - friendly or even touching - accurate observations of a domestic nature, deep social generalizations is revealed in kolomyikas.

Concise, but very clearly, embossed everyday and festive life; in kolomyika-choruses to dance details of bright Hutsul clothes growl: necklaces, Tibetan scarves, slippers with drapes, vests, embroidered shirts, rats with red china, painted bags, wire spare parts, corals.

Research and evaluation of kolomyika 
The first known records of kolomyika specimens date back to the 17th century, but there is documentary evidence of their existence in ancient times. This original variety of Ukrainian folk songs has long attracted the attention of Slavic scholars. Beginning in the first third of the 19th century, translations of kolomyikas and scientific investigations into them appeared in the Ukrainian, Russian, and Polish press. Serious studies devoted to this genre belong to I. Franko, F. Kolessa, V. Hnatyuk, M. Zhynyk, M. Hrinchenko and other folklorists.

Hnatyuk advised writers to learn to create highly artistic artistic images in Kolomyia, using the vernacular, its characteristic inversions, comparisons. Ideological and aesthetic qualities of kolomyikas were highly appreciated by Lesya Ukrainka and M. Kotsyubynsky. Kolomyikas inspired themes, images, motives for many literary works. They are especially organic in the stories and novels of I. Franko, L. Martovych, P. Kozlanyuk.

Bela Bartok and the Kolomyika 
Hungarian composer Bela Bartok's first concerto for piano and orchestra incorporates a rhythmic and melodic scheme that has a symmetrical structure, combining two measure units, that move typically in a narrow stepwise motion and often use scalar patterns and note repetitions. In Hungary, this rhythmic type is associated with the swineherd dance that Bartok believed was derived from the Ukrainian kolomyika. Bartok also considered the swineherd songs to be the source of the popular kurucz song repertoire and of the instrumental verbunkos (recruiting dance), suggesting that these too were based on kolomyika melodies: "the latter (Verbunkos), again, seems at least partially a derivation from the so-called Hungarian Shepherd dance melodies whose source is probably the Ukrainian Kolomyjka dance-melodies" (Bela Bartok), "Concerning the origin of the Rumanian (b) 1 and (c) types, let us indicate two alternatives, however, in principle equally possible. They may have originated directly from either the Verbunkos music or the Ukrainian Kolomyjka. The latter alternative is likely because of the comparatively long frontier between Rumanian and Ukrainian linguistic territory." (Bela Bartok)

Bela Bartok intuitively defined the path of development of Hungarian music as follows:

ukrainian kolomyika → hungarian chabanivska song → recruiting music → new hungarian folk song

Affinity of kolomyika 
Songs that combine singing with dancing in a circle have a certain commonality with kolomyika songs - Serbian kolo, Slovenian and Slovak kalamayki and karichki, Czech do kolochka, Bulgarian horo.

Development in the diaspora 
In North America, the kolomyika is primarily a social dance. Participants form a circle, joining hands. The dance begins with the participants turning the circle, usually counterclockwise, then clockwise, or by forming a spiral. Further into the dance soloists will perform in the centre of the circle.

According to Andriy Nahachewsky, a former professional stage dancer, Director of the Kule Centre for Ukrainian and Canadian Folklore, and Huculak Chair of Ukrainian Culture and Ethnography at the University of Alberta, kolomyiky as practised in Canada are a separate genre of dance from what is known in Ukraine. The diasporic kolomyika developed from the old country folk dance but with a prevailing influence from stage dancing. Originating in Western Canada in the 1950s and 60s, the kolomyika is considered the highlight of Ukrainian weddings and dances in Canada: when any attendees who have experience as stage dancers perform their favourite "tricks" involving lifts, spins, high kicks, even building human pyramids. It is a chance for individuals and groups to "show off" their most impressive or dangerous moves so as to entertain the audience and win approval. Nahachewsky suggests that despite being a relatively new tradition the Canadian kolomyika is an important symbol of Ukrainian culture in Canada and that the dynamism of this type of Ukrainian dance helps to interest young people in Canada in retaining Ukrainian culture.

Performers
Ruslana, performs Kolomyika motifs through folk pop songs

See also
Related dances:
Arkan (dance)
Hutsulka
Uvyvanets
Kolo (dance)

References

External links
 Example by Stepan Hrytsai (Grytsai). YouTube
 Example by Merry Fellows (Veseli Vujki). YouTube

Hutsuls
Ukrainian folk dances
Competitive dance
Social dance
Canadian dances
Wedding traditions
Ukrainian words and phrases
Ukrainian-Canadian culture